|}
{| class="collapsible collapsed" cellpadding="0" cellspacing="0" style="clear:right; float:right; text-align:center; font-weight:bold;" width="280px"
! colspan="3" style="border:1px solid black; background-color: #77DD77;" | Also Ran

The 1981 Epsom Derby was the 202nd annual running of the Derby horse race. It took place at Epsom Downs Racecourse on 3 June 1981.

The race was won by the Aga Khan's Shergar, at odds of 10/11 ridden by the nineteen-year-old jockey Walter Swinburn and trained at Newmarket, Suffolk by Michael Stoute. The winning margin of ten lengths was the largest in the history of the race. However, the winning time of 2:44.21 was the slowest since 1946.

Race details
 Sponsor: none
 Winner's prize money: £149,900
 Going: Dead
 Number of runners: 18
 Winner's time: 2 minutes, 44.21 seconds

Full result

1 Lydian was scratched at the start after refusing to enter the stalls.

Winner details
Further details of the winner, Shergar:

 Foaled: 3 March 1978, in Ireland
 Sire: Great Nephew; Dam: Sharmeen (Val de Loir)
 Owner: Aga Khan IV
 Breeder: Aga Khan IV

Form analysis

Two-year-old races
Notable runs by the future Derby participants as two-year-olds in 1980:
 Church Parade – 1st in Lanson Champagne Stakes, 3rd in Champagne Stakes
 Glint of Gold – 1st in Gran Criterium
 Kalaglow – 1st in Horris Hill Stakes
 Robellino – 2nd in Chesham Stakes, 1st in Seaton Delaval Stakes, 1st in Royal Lodge Stakes
 Sheer Grit – 3rd in William Hill Futurity
 Shergar – 2nd in William Hill Futurity

The road to Epsom
Early-season appearances in 1981 and trial races prior to running in the Derby:
 Al Nasr – 1st in Prix La Force
 Glint of Gold – 1st in Derby Italiano
 Kind of Hush – 1st in Craven Stakes
 Kings General – 3rd in Sandown Classic Trial
 Riberetto – 1st in Lingfield Derby Trial
 Robellino – 2nd in Blue Riband Trial Stakes
 Scintillating Air – 3rd in Dante Stakes
 Sheer Grit – 2nd in Lingfield Derby Trial
 Shergar – 1st in Sandown Classic Trial, 1st in Chester Vase
 Shotgun – 2nd in Dante Stakes
 Sunley Builds – 2nd in Chester Vase

Subsequent Group 1 wins
Group 1 / Grade I victories after running in the Derby.

 Al Nasr – Prix d'Ispahan (1982)
 Glint of Gold – Grand Prix de Paris (1981), Preis von Europa (1981),  Grand Prix de Saint-Cloud (1982),  Grosser Preis von Baden (1982)
 Kalaglow – Eclipse Stakes (1982), King George VI and Queen Elizabeth Stakes (1982)
 Shergar – Irish Derby (1981), King George VI and Queen Elizabeth Stakes (1981)

Subsequent breeding careers

Leading progeny of participants in the 1981 Epsom Derby.

Stallions of Classic winners
Robellino (14th)
 Mister Baileys – 1st 2000 Guineas Stakes (1996)
 Classic Park – 1st Irish 1,000 Guineas (1997) Dam of Epsom Derby runner up and leading National Hunt sire Walk In The Park
 Robertico – 1st Deutsches Derby (1998)
 Royal Rebel – 1st Ascot Gold Cup (2001),(2002)
Shergar (1st)
 Authaal – 1st Irish St Leger (1986)
 Maysoon – 2nd 1000 Guineas Stakes (1986), 3rd Epsom Oaks (1986)
 Shibil – 3rd Derby Italiano (1986)
 Sherkraine – 2nd Phoenix Stakes (1985)
Al Nasr (17th)
 Zaizoom – 1st Derby Italiano (1987)
 Acteur Francais - 2nd Poule d'Essai des Poulains (1991)
 Nasr El Arab – 1st Charles H. Strub Stakes (1989), 1st San Juan Capistrano Handicap (1989)
 Prince Of Andros – 1st Tattersalls Gold Cup (1995)

Stallions of Group/Grade One winners
Kalaglow (13th)
 Jeune – Australian Champion Racehorse of the Year (1994–1995)
 Sternkönig – 3rd Deutsches Derby (1993), 1st Deutschland-Preis (1994) Sire of 2000 Derby Italiano winner Kallisto
 Timarida – 1st Beverly D. Stakes (1996), 1st Bayerisches Zuchtrennen (1996), 1st Irish Champion Stakes (1996)
 Shining Water – 1st Solario Stakes (1986) Dam of Tenby, Bude and Bright And Clear
Glint of Gold (2nd)
 Heart of Darkness – 1st National Stakes (1990)
 Warfield – 3rd Prix du Cadran (1991)
 Spinning – 3rd Man o' War Stakes (1992)
 Vagog – 1st Long Walk Hurdle (1992)
 Ikdam – 1st Triumph Hurdle (1989)

Stallions of National Hunt horses
Sheer Grit (6th)
 Clay County – 1st Northumberland Gold Cup Novices' Chase (1991)
 Unsinkable Boxer – 1st Sefton Novices' Hurdle (1998)
Riberetto (8th)
 Jocks Cross – 1st Welsh National (2000)
 Tarrs Bridge – 1st Bristol Novices' Hurdle (1996)
Sunley Builds (9th)
 Sunley Bay – 1st Mandarin Handicap Chase (1996)

Other stallions
Kind Of Hush (16th) – Itsabrahma (2nd Prix de la Forêt 1991), Osario (3rd Prix de la Forêt 1991)Silver Season (7th) – Great grandsire of 2007 Lancashire Oaks winner Turbo LinnChurch Parade (5th) – Exported to New Zealand, produced 1988 New Zealand 2000 Guineas runner up TestamentScintillating Air (3rd) – Exported to India

References

External links
 Colour Chart – Derby 1981

Epsom Derby
Epsom Derby
Epsom Derby
Epsom Derby
 1981
1980s in Surrey